is a Japanese basketball player, who plays center for the Toyota Antelopes in the Women's Japan Basketball League.

Career
While attending Takushoku University, she led her team to its first national championship in 2008, and was named the year's most valuable player. Takushoku was again victorious in 2010, with Mori earning her second MVP honors. While at university, she played on the national team at both the 2007 and 2009 Summer Universiade.

After graduating in 2011, Mori joined the Toyota Antelopes in the WJBL, helping them finish second in both the 2011–2012 and 2012–2013 seasons. The Antelopes won their first Empress's Cup in 2013.

In 2013, she was selected to the national team for that year's FIBA Asia Championship for Women.

Personal
Mori has a Japanese father and a Filipino mother.

References

External links 
 Official profile 

1988 births
Living people
Japanese women's basketball players
Japanese people of Filipino descent
People from Kawasaki, Kanagawa
Sportspeople from Kanagawa Prefecture
Takushoku University alumni
Basketball players at the 2014 Asian Games
Asian Games medalists in basketball
Asian Games bronze medalists for Japan
Medalists at the 2014 Asian Games
Centers (basketball)
21st-century Japanese women